Cathartosilvanus opaculus is a species of silvanid flat bark beetle in the family Silvanidae. It is found in the Caribbean Sea, Central America, North America, and South America.

References

Further reading

 
 

Silvanidae
Articles created by Qbugbot
Beetles described in 1854